Shubenkov is a Russian masculine surname, its feminine counterpart is Shubenkova. Notable people with the surname include:

Natalya Shubenkova (born 1957), Russian heptathlete
Sergey Shubenkov (born 1990), Russian hurdler, son of Natalya

Russian-language surnames